= Akto Festival =

The Akto Festival for Contemporary Arts is a regional festival in Bitola, North Macedonia. The festival includes visual arts, performing arts, music and theory of culture. The first Akto festival was held in 2006. The aim of the festival is to open the cultural frameworks of a modern society through "recomposing" and redefining them in a new context. In the past, the festival featured artists from regional countries like Slovenia, Greece or Bulgaria, but also from Germany, Italy, France and Austria.

The Association for culture and art FRU – Faculty of things that can't be learned works as a project platform in the area of contemporary art and culture, focused on event production whose purpose is to create critical engagement and active participation of citizens in the creation of the public socio-political discourse inside the community.

One of FRU's main activities is the annual AKTO Festival for contemporary art (started in Bitola, 2006), that has imposed itself as a serious part in promoting and producing new forms of influence on the civil consciousness, locally and regionally. AKTO Festival has been cooperating with several regional organizations in partnership projects, executing 9 editions so far, with the participation of about 300 artists, presented via numerous exhibitions, conferences, different kinds of events, etc. such as festivals Perforacije (Zagreb), Culturescapes (Bazel) and the regional networks BCC / Balcan Can Contemporary and Urban Hum and the regional projects Listening to the Audience, LIVING LIBRARIES: archives of civil disobedience, If Buildings Could Talks etc.

Artistic director and president of FRU is Filip Jovanovski (artist, activist, and curator), and Ivana Vaseva (curator, and program coordinator of FRU).

Pop UP AKTO is the new edition of AKTO Festival for contemporary arts – the last 10 years it was happening in August in Bitola (2006–2015) – transformed, renewed and reshaped. It stars its new journey not as an annual festival with 3 – day condensed program but as a series of mini curated festivals or festive events that pop up in different cities in North Macedonia, starting from Stip, Skopje, Tetovo and Bitola. Thematically, Pop UP AKTO is exploring the city environment and dwelling, its places of memory and the new adjectives attached to them as part of the city's transformation. It talks about the positive aspect of being in the city – on one's own or being together and aims at promoting places of democratic expression on freedom and inclusion of citizens from experts to amateurs.

The new cycle of AKTO Festival forms itself from the rethinking of its position as a festival that contributes towards the change of the current cultural and public policy, budget-wise, production-wise and distribution-wise. The idea of this program of events in 3 cities stems to empower the local community to feel the cultural production in the country, share the experience and motivate to continue the ideas beyond this organizational structure. It intends to make a network of citizens which will have two main missions: 1. INSIDE to empower the local communities in each local context (the mayor being “father figure” having the total control in the city leaving unsatisfied citizens and young people immigrating) 2. OUTSIDE network of people and organizations that will share knowledge, experience and programs
